Alexander Yakovlevich Lerner (7 September 1913, Vinnytsia, Russian Empire – 6 April 2004, Rehovot, Israel) was a scientist and Soviet refusenik.

He was born to a Jewish family in Vinnytsia, Russian Empire (now Ukraine). Lerner graduated with a degree in electrical engineering from the Moscow Power Engineering Institute in 1938, and received a Ph.D. from the same institution in 1940. During World War II, Lerner served as the chief engineer of the Central Autonomous Laboratory at the Soviet Ministry of Ferrous Metallurgy in Moscow.

Lerner became a member of the Soviet scientific and technological elite. He was a leading practitioner of cybernetics. It is a branch of science that deals with human control systems like the brain and nervous systems where they interconnect with complex electronic systems. His mathematical equations were used in forecasting supply and demand for vital materials like steel, or allocating scarce resources.
 
He was the first prominent Soviet scientist to seek to emigrate to Israel. His request was denied, and resulted in the sudden loss of his positions and privileges. In 1977, a letter was published in the Soviet newspaper Izvestiya calling Lerner "the leader of an espionage nest." His closest associates in the refusenik movement — Natan Sharansky, Vladimir Slepak and Ida Nudel — were arrested.
He was finally granted an exit permit and emigrated to Israel on 27 January 1988, together with his son, daughter-in-law and granddaughter.

Lerner accepted an appointment in the mathematics department at the Weizmann Institute of Science where he pursued a number of projects, including the development of an artificial heart and the construction of a mathematical model to predict the behavior of developed societies.

He died in 2004 in Rehovot at the age of 90.

Famous followers 
Professor Vladimir Burkov, the head of Laboratory of Active Systems in V.A. Trapeznikov Institute of Control Sciences of RAS, Moscow, Russia.

Professor Vladimir Vapnik, pioneer in statistical learning theory.

References 

1913 births
2004 deaths
Cyberneticists
People from Vinnytsia
Ukrainian Jews
Soviet dissidents
Soviet people accused of spying for the West
Refuseniks
Soviet electrical engineers
Ukrainian electrical engineers